The third season of Ídolos premiered in October, 2009 on SIC, over four years after the second season finished.

The last show aired on February 14, 2010, with the victory of Filipe Pinto.

Judges
On this season the only remaining judge was Manuel Moura dos Santos. The other three are new to the show.

Manuel Moura dos Santos - Manager
Laurent Filipe - Musician
Roberta Medina - Director of Rock in Rio
Pedro Boucherie - Director of the cable TV stations of SIC.

Contestants

Winner
Filipe Pinto, 21 years old, from São Mamede Infesta (Matosinhos).

In order of elimination
Melina Pires 18, from Rio de Mouro - Top 10
Mariana Tavares 18, from Entroncamento - Top 9
Catarina Boto 17, from Venda do Pinheiro - Top 8
Salvador Sobral 19, from Lisbon- Top 7
Carolina Torres 20, from Maia - Top 6
Solange Hilário 16, from Matosinhos- Top 5
Inês Laranjeira 16, from Montijo - Top 5
Carlos Costa, 17, from Madeira - Top 3
Diana Piedade 24, from Lagos - Runner-up

Semi-finalists (Top 15)
André Cruz, 16, from Amadora
Diogo Alvarenga 19, from Porto
Márcio Costa 24, from Lisbon
Mariline Hortigueira 23, from Cascais
Marta Silva 23, from Cabeceiras de Basto

Show

Top 15 (Idols' Choice)

The Top 15 performed live on television on December 6, 2009. In the next day the results were revealed. The five performers with the highest vote from the public were automatically qualified for the finals. Then the jury decided the remaining 5 finalists that completed the Idol's Top 10. (People in bold were eliminated.)

Wild Card

Top 10 (Big Bands)
The top 10 performed live on television on December 13, 2009. After all contestants performed the public votes were revealed. Catarina Boto and Melina Pires were the bottom 2 and Melina was eliminated (in bold). From now on the competition the decision to whom was eliminated was entire responsibility of the public.

Top 9 (Dedications)
The Top 9 performed live on television on December 20, 2009. The theme was "dedication", so that the contestants could dedicate the chosen song to whatever they wanted. After their performances the voting was revealed. Diana Piedade and Mariana Tavares were the bottom 2 and Mariana was evicted (in bold).

Top 8 (Michael Jackson tribute)
The top 8 performed live on television on December 27, 2010. In this show the contestants performed song of Michael Jackson's solo career or of the Jackson 5. After all the contestants performed the voting was revealed. Catarina Boto and Carolina Torres were the bottom 2 and Catarina was evicted (bold).

In between the two shows, SIC organised a special "réveillon" show putting with the Idol's contestants and the remaining crew (hosts, judges,...). There were also special appearances of comedians like Ana Bola, Manuel Marques, etc.

Top 7 (Portuguese music)
The top 7 performed live on television on January 3, 2010. The theme was Portuguese music, as a result of the constant critics of the contestants choice for songs sung in English. After all the contestants performed the voting was revealed. Salvador Sobral and Solange Hilário were the bottom 2 and Salvador was evicted. The votes were 100% televoting. The person in bold was eliminated.

Top 6 (Unmistakable Voices)
The top 6 performed live on television on January 9. The theme was Unmistakable Voices. After all the contestants performed the voting was revealed. Carolina Torres and Inês Laranjeira were the bottom 2 and Carolina Torres was evicted. The votes were 100% televoting. The person in bold was eliminated.

Top 5 (Judges choice)
The top 5 performed live on television on January 17. The contestants performed two songs. One selected by the judges and another of their choice. After all the contestants performed the voting was revealed. Inês Laranjeira and Solange Hilário were the bottom 2 and Solange Hilário had the lowest votes. However the judges used a power that they had since the 5th gala and that could only be used once and this was the last time they could use it. This way, the judges have the power to save the contestant with the fewest votes, but in the next gala instead of having one evicted contestant there will be two. The votes were 100% televoting. The person in bold received the lowest votes but was saved by the judges.

Top 5 (Birth Year and 21st Century)
The top 5 performed 2 songs each. One of the songs was from the year they were born and another song had to be released in the 21st century. After all the contestants performed the voting was revealed. Carlos Costa, Inês Laranjeira e Solange Hilário were the bottom 3 and Inês Laranjeira and Solange Hilário were evicted. The votes were 100% televoting. The persons in bold were evicted.

Top 3 (Audience Choice, Idols Choice and 'Enemies' Choice)
The top 3 performed 3 songs each. The first one was chosen by one of the fellows, the other by them and, finally, the last one by public. After all the contestants performed the voting was revealed. Filipe Pinto was the first to know that he was one of the finalists and Diana Piedade was the next. Carlos Costa was evicted. The votes were 100% televoting. The person in bold was evicted.

Carlos Costa - David Bisbal - Ave Maria (Chosen by Diana)
Carlos Costa - Nelly Furtado - Say it Right (Idols Choice)
Carlos Costa - Michael Bolton - When a Man Loves a Woman (Audience Choice)
Diana Piedade - Jacques Brel - Ne me Quitte Pas (Chosen by Filipe)
Diana Piedade - Tina Turner - Proud Mary (Idols Choice)
Diana Piedade - Rolling Stones - Satisfaction (Audience Choice)
Filipe Pinto - Carlos Santana - Smooth (Chosen by Carlos)
Filipe Pinto - Ornatos Violeta - Ouvi Dizer (Idols Choice)
Filipe Pinto - Oasis - Don't Look Back in Anger (Audience Choice)

Top 2
The top 2 performed 4 songs each. The show was aired live on 7 February 2010. The first one was a duet, the second one was chosen under the theme 'Soundtracks', the other was sung along with Pedro Abrunhosa, a famous Portuguese singer and composer, and, finally, the last one was the song which they wanted to win.

Diana Piedade and Filipe Pinto - Whitesnake - Here I Go Again
Diana Piedade - Ray Charles - Hit The Road Jack, from the movie Ray
Diana Piedade & Pedro Abrunhosa - Momento
Diana Piedade - Led Zeppelin - Whole Lotta Love
Filipe Pinto - Goo Goo Dolls - Iris, from the movie City of Angels
Filipe Pinto & Pedro Abrunhosa - Eu Não Sei Quem Te Perdeu
Filipe Pinto - Nirvana - Lithium

The Big Finale (The Best of Ídolos)
The two top finalists performed 2 songs each. The show was aired live on 14 February 2010. As it was Valentine's Day, they sang their best love song ever. After this song, they both sang one of the songs they sang during the auditions. GNR were specially invited to perform during the show.

Diana Piedade - Jeff Buckley - Lover, You Should've Come Over
Diana Piedade - Duffy - Mercy
Filipe Pinto - Bush - Letting The Cables Sleep
Filipe Pinto - Pearl Jam - Better Man

Beside these performances, ex-contestants also performed:

All contestants, including Diana Piedade and Filipe Pinto - Coldplay medley - The Scientist/Viva La Vida
Carlos Costa – Lady Gaga - Paparazzi
Carolina Torres and Inês Laranjeira – Shirley Bassey - Big Spender
Melina Pires and Mariana Tavares – The Fray - How to Save a Life
Solange Hilário and Catarina Boto – Aretha Franklin - Respect

Elimination chart

IDOLOMANIA 2010
After the end of the program, a national tour was provided, including all the top 15 contestants, except for Salvador Sobral, who did not accept the offer as he is at university. These are the dates confirmed until the date.

March 13 - Lisbon (Campo Pequeno)
March 20- Viseu (Multiusos)
March 27- Sta Maria da Feira (Europarque)
April 1- São Miguel (Açores) (Coliseu)
April 3- Portimão (Arena)
April 10- Elvas (Coliseu)
April 17- Guimarães (Multiusos)

CD
After the end of the show, it was also released a CD with the best moments of the top 10 contestants, named Ídolos – Os Melhores Momentos.

1.Filipe Pinto - Ouvi Dizer
2.Diana Piedade - Piece Of My Heart
3.Carlos Costa - Say My Name
4.Solange Hilário - I Wanna Dance With Somebody
5.Inês Laranjeira - Big Spender
6.Catarina Boto - Sweet Dreams
7.Mariana Tavares - Ironic
8.Carolina Torres - Psycho Killer
9.Melina Pires - Son Of a Preacher Man
10.Mariline Hortigueira - O Sopro do Coração

After Idolos

Mariline Hortigueira
After her eviction, Mariline was asked to be the cover of a male magazine, FHM. This became reality in the January 2010 edition.

Catarina Boto
Catarina became the official voice of the beginning song of the new SIC soap opera, Lua Vermelha, which is a ripoff of the North American bestseller novel by Stephenie Meyer, the Twilight series. The song is a cover of a GNR's song, Morte ao Sol(Death at the Sun).

Carolina Torres
After eviction, Carolina was offered a job as a presenter in a SIC Radical talk-show, Curto-Circuito, by Pedro Boucherie Mendes, member of the jury and director of the theme TV stations of SIC. She was recently part, of a commercial made by one of the largest supermarkets in Portugal, Jumbo.

Salvador Sobral
Sobral won the Eurovision Song Contest 2017 with 758 points.

External links
Official Website

2009 Portuguese television seasons
2010 Portuguese television seasons
Season 03